A retracted vowel is a vowel sound in which the body or root of the tongue is pulled backward and downward into the pharynx. Raised or front vowels may be partially retracted, for example by an adjacent uvular consonant or by vowel harmony based on retracted tongue root.

Retracted vowels and raised vowels constitute the traditional, but articulatorily inaccurate, category of back vowels.

References

Vowels